Curious Things is a mini-album by the English progressive rock band Tinyfish.

Track listing 
 "The June Jar" – 3:20
 "Ack Ack" – 0:25
 "She's All I Want" – 3:03
 "Driving All Night" – 4:12
 "Why VHF?" – 8:18
 "Wrecking Ball" - 3:28
 "Cinnamon" - 6:03

Personnel
 Simon Godfrey – Lead vocals, guitars, guitar synthesizer, drums
 Jim Sanders – Guitars, backing vocals
 Paul Worwood – Bass guitar, bass pedals
 Robert Ramsay – Spoken word, harmonica

Reception
Curious Things was named as fifteenth best album of 2009 by Geoff Barton
in Classic Rock Presents Prog, a sister publication of the UK magazine Classic Rock.

References

2009 albums
Tinyfish albums